The Corwith Cramer is a tall ship (specifically a brigantine) owned by the Sea Education Association (SEA) sailing school, named after SEA's founding director. Her home port is Woods Hole, Massachusetts, United States. She was designed by Wooden and Marean specifically for SEA and was constructed by ASTACE in 1987 in Bilbao, Spain. She is a  steel brigantine built as a research vessel for operation under sail, and generally sails in the Atlantic Ocean.

See also
SSV Robert C. Seamans
Brigantine
Woods Hole
Nautical terms
Rigging
Tall ship

External links
Sea Education Association
Corwith Cramer Technical Info
Slideshow of a cruise
Current position reports

Brigantines
Individual sailing vessels
Training ships
Tall ships of the United States
Sail training ships
1987 ships
Lake Forest Academy alumni